Lhachen Bhagan was a Basgo king who united Ladakh in 1460 by overthrowing the king of Leh. He took on the surname Namgyal (meaning victorious) and founded the Namgyal dynasty of Ladakh.

Founding of the Namgyal dynasty
According to the Ladakh Chronicles, Bhagan was the son of Bhara in the kingdom of Maryul. Bhagan was described as warlike, and established the Namgyal dynasty in 1460 after he formed an alliance with the people of Leh and dethroned the Maryul king Blo-gros-mc-og-ldan and his brothers drun-pa A-li and Slab-bstan-dar-rgyas.

References

Kings of Ladakh
Founding monarchs